Bihar Museum is a museum located in Patna. It was partially opened in August 2015.  'The children's museum', the main entrance area, and an  orientation theatre were the only parts opened to the public in August 2015. Later, in October 2017 remaining galleries were also opened. More than 100 artifacts were transferred here from Patna Museum.

Overview

In July 2011, the Bihar Government  signed a Memorandum of understanding with Canada-based consultancy firm Lord Cultural Resources in July 2011 to appoint them as the museum planning consultants for the project. In January 2012, following an international architectural competition, Japan-based Maki & Associates and its Indian partner OPOLIS, Mumbai were appointed as the primary consultant architect for the project. The completed museum is spread over 5.6 hectares, having 24,000 square meters of built area.

Lord Cultural Resources designed the exhibitions in the museum's nine permanent galleries. Artefacts from ancient India to 1764 are on display in Bihar Museum's permanent gallery, while those of the post-1764 period are on display at the older Patna Museum. The 2300 year old Didarganj Yakshi is among the highlight exhibits in the Bihar Museum.

In October 2017, Prime Minister of India Narendra Modi visited Bihar Museum with Bihar Chief Minister Nitish Kumar.

Location
It is located in Patna, the capital city of the East Indian state of Bihar. Its exact location is on the southern flank of Jawaharlal Nehru Marg, Bailey Road, in Patna. It is spread over an area of 13.9 acres. The site of the proposed museum was earlier occupied by seven old bungalows between LN Mishra Institute and Hartali Mor in Bailey Road. Later in March 2013, the building construction department demolished all the bungalows.

Exhibits
The Bihar Museum has several galleries. These include the Orientation gallery, the children gallery, the regional gallery, the contemporary gallery, the historical art galleries, the Bihari Diaspora gallery and the visible storage gallery. The exhibits on different subjects are displayed in separate galleries. Each gallery is huge and has many artifacts on display including ones dating back to the fourth century.

Orientation gallery

The gallery gives an overview of the Museum and a theatre is located at the end of the gallery. A brief film introducing the museum and its collections is screened in the auditorium regularly. Film shows on Bihar's timeline and Bihar's history are also shown.

Children's gallery

Its collection of artefacts and exhibit items is divided into six domains: the Orientation Room, the Wildlife Sanctuary, the history sections on Chandragupta Maurya and Sher Shah Suri, the Arts and Culture section and the Discovery Room. Among the exhibits are a simulated the Asian paradise flycatcher, the Indian giant flying squirrel, animals, birds, trees and plants native to the state of Bihar. The gallery's focus is family learning; most exhibits are designed to be interactive, allowing children and families to actively participate.

History galleries

History Gallery A
The gallery has various artefacts from the Harappan Civilization also known as Indus Valley civilization, the second urbanization and Haryanka. The whole collection of this gallery represents the advanced technology and sophisticated lifestyle of the Harappan people. The gallery has objects from the fourth century BCE to the first century BCE. It has objects spanning three major dynasties of India; the Mauryas, the Nandas and the Shishunagas. The gallery also houses fragments of railings from various ancient Stupas that are carved on with episodes from Buddha's and Mahavira’s life.

History Gallery B
This gallery exhibits artifacts from the Gupta Dynasty (4th-6th centuries CE).

History Gallery C

Regional gallery
The gallery has curated exhibitions of Crafts, folk culture and traditions of Bihar.

Historical Art
The gallery’s main attraction is the Didarganj Yakshi.

Bihari Diaspora gallery
The Bihari Diaspora Gallery explores the contribution of Bihari people in making indelible imprints in the history and culture of other lands where they settled. The gallery provides the historic context of how Biharis were relocated to countries like Mauritius, Bangladesh and beyond. Some were recruited as labourers in the early days of the East India Company and others explored foreign lands on their own initiative. Activate an interactive map to learn about the origins of Bihari culture, trade routes and how the population has relocated in foreign lands. Aside of the past movements, also discover recent stories of the people of Bihar, their accomplishments and their involvements, to understand the influence Bihar has had around the world. Battling extremely adverse conditions, many common Biharis along with Bihari greats have impacted the destiny of history, culture and society of India.

Visible storage gallery

Apart from the galleries, there is publication and education section, sales counter, cafeteria etc. There is a restaurant for authentic Bihari cuisine, named as The Potbelly inside Bihar Museum.

Heritage tunnel to Patna Museum
In January 2023, Government of Bihar appointed Delhi Metro Railway Corporation Ltd as consultant for the construction of a 1.4-km-long proposed subway (heritage tunnel) between Bihar Museum and Patna Museum.

Accolades
Bihar Museum's branding and wayfinding signage consultants Lopez Design Pvt. Ltd received multiple awards for their design for the museum's brand identity, including the iF Design Award, German Design Award and the Kyoorius Inbook Award 2016 in the Writing for Design category for its booklet I am Bihar Museum.

In December 2019, the museum received the GRIHA Award along with a five-star rating. GRIHA stands for Green Rating for Integrated Habitat Assessment.

Gallery

See also

 Patna Museum
 Gandhi Sangrahalaya, Patna
 International Museum Day
 List of museums in Bihar

References

External links
  of Bihar Museum

Museums in Patna
State museums in India
Government buildings in Bihar
2015 establishments in Bihar
Museums established in 2015